WoodmenLife Tower, formerly the Woodmen Tower, is a 478-ft (146-m) high-rise building at 1700 Farnam Street in downtown Omaha, Nebraska, and headquarters of WoodmenLife insurance company.

History
Construction began in 1966, with the tower being completed in 1969. The tower surpassed the Nebraska State Capitol  as the tallest building in Nebraska, which held the title from 1930 until 1969, when it was completed.  The 30-storey skyscraper remained the tallest skyscraper in both Omaha and Nebraska for over 30 years, until the construction of the First National Bank Tower.

A population of Peregrine falcons have resided on the tower, with the first being released there by the Nebraska Peregrine Falcon Project in 1988.  Falcons continue to nest on the building, and WoodmenLife maintains a live webcam of the nests on their official website.  

The building was featured prominently in the 2002 film About Schmidt, where the titular character Warren Schmidt (Jack Nicholson) was employed. The Woodmen Tower also replaced several buildings in historic downtown, including the Old City Hall and Edward Rosewater's Bee Building. 

In 2020 the "WOODMEN" signage atop the building was replaced the new WoodmenLife wordmark to reflect the organization's new name.

Gallery

See also
Economy of Omaha, Nebraska
List of tallest buildings in Omaha, Nebraska

Notes

Skyscraper office buildings in Omaha, Nebraska
Woodmen of the World buildings
Headquarters in the United States
1969 establishments in Nebraska
Office buildings completed in 1969